"Lonely One" is a song by Japanese singer-songwriter Nariaki Obukuro, featuring Japanese-American singer-songwriter Hikaru Utada. The song was released on 17 January 2018 as the first single from Obukuro's debut studio album.

Track listing
"Lonely One" (featuring Hikaru Utada) – 4:41

Credits and personnel
 Nariaki Obukuro – songwriting, vocals
 Hikaru Utada – production, songwriting, vocals
 Youki Kojima – songwriting

Charts

Release history

References

2018 singles
2018 songs
Songs written by Hikaru Utada
Hikaru Utada songs